The 2014 Kagame Interclub Cup was the 39th edition of the Kagame Interclub Cup, which is organised by CECAFA. It is taking place in Kigali, Rwanda from 8–24 August. Rwanda is hosting the tournament for the fourth time since its inception in 1974.

All times shown are in Central Africa Time (UTC+2).

Broadcasting
South African sports channel SuperSport secured official rights to broadcast all matches played at the tournament.

Participants
On 11 July 2014, the draw for clubs to participate in the tournament was released at the Amahoro Stadium, one of the two host venues. Rwandan President Paul Kagame, the sponsor of the tournament, committed a total of US$60,000 for prize money, while an additional US$15,000 was committed to the organisation of the event. Yanga was scheduled as the Tanzanian representative but was removed by CECAFA because the club decided to field a second string side in the tournament which is against the tournament regulation and were replaced by Azam. Just like the reigning Burundi champion Flambeau de l'Est who was replaced by Atlético Olympic and the Ethiopian side Ethiopian Coffee who was replaced by Adama City.

The following 14 clubs took part in the competition:

Group A
 Rayon Sports
 Azam
 Adama City
 Atlabara
 KMKM

Group B
 Armée Patriotique Rwandaise
 Kampala Capital City Authority
 Atlético Olympic
 Gor Mahia
 Djibouti Télécom

Group C
 Vital'O
 Al-Merrikh
 Police
 Benadir

Group stage
The group stage featured fourteen teams, with 5 teams in Group A and B and 4 team in Group C. Three teams from Group A and B and two teams from Group C advanced to the knockout stage.

The group stage began on 8 August and is scheduled to conclude on 17 August.

Group A

Group B

Group C

Knockout stage
In the knockout stage, teams play against each other once. The losers of the semi-finals played against each other in a third place playoff where the winner was placed third overall in the entire competition.

Bracket

Quarter-finals

Semi-finals

Third place playoff

Final

Top scorers

Own goals

References

Kagame Interclub Cup
Kagame Interclub Cup
Kag
International association football competitions hosted by Rwanda